Roepkiella chloratoides is a moth in the family Cossidae. It is found on Borneo. The habitat consists of lowland areas and hill dipterocarp forests.

The length of the forewings is 17 mm for males and about 19 mm for females. The forewings are reddish brown with fine striae.

References

Natural History Museum Lepidoptera generic names catalog

Cossinae